Thasgam is a village in Drass tehsil in Kargil district of the Indian union territory of Ladakh. The village is located 36 kilometres from the district and tehsil headquarters Kargil.

Demographics
According to the 2011 census of India, Thasgam has 43 households. The literacy rate of Thasgam village is 70.70%. In Thasgam, male literacy stands at 84.57% while the female literacy rate was 55.92%.

Transport

Road
Thasgam is well-connected by road to other places in Ladakh and India by the Srinagar-Leh Highway or the NH 1.

Rail
The nearest railway station to Thasgam is the Srinagar railway station located at a distance of 190 kilometres.

Air
The nearest airport is at Kargil located at a distance of 45 kilometres but it is currently non-operational. The next nearest major airports are Srinagar International Airport and Leh Airport located at a distance of 188 kilometres and 251 kilometres.

See also
Ladakh
Kargil
Suru Valley
Drass

References

Villages in Drass tehsil